Drum Sum is the second album by American jazz percussionist Buck Clarke. The album was released in 1961. Recorded November 8, 1960 at Bell Sound Studios, New York on Argo Records. The album features Fred Williams, Don McKenzie, Clement Wells, Charles Hampton and Roscoe Hunter.

Track listing 

 "Woody 'n' You" (Dizzy Gillespie) – 4:27
 "Don't Get Around Much Anymore" (Duke Ellington, Bob Russell) – 2:45
 "Funk Roots" (Fred Williams) – 2:45
 "Darben, The Redd Foxx" (Charles Hampton) – 3:07
 "Bags' Groove" (Milt Jackson) – 4:10
 "Blues For Us" (Clark, McKenzie, Hampton, Williams, Hunter) – 4:50
 "Georgia" (Hoagy Carmichael, Stuart Gorrell) – 2:40
 "Drum Sum" (Fred Williams) – 3:05
 "Buckskins" (Charles Hampton) – 3:42
 "I Got Rhythm" (George Gershwin, Ira Gershwin) - 3:02

Personnel 

Charles Hampton – clarinet, alto saxophone, wood flute, piano
Clement Wells – vibes
Fred Williams – bass
Roscoe Hunter – drums
Buck Clarke – congas, bongos

Production notes:

Ralph Bass - recording supervisor
Don Bronstein - design
Leonard Feather - liner notes

References 

Buck Clarke albums
1961 albums
Argo Records albums